The Allmendhubel (1,932 m) is a hill above Mürren, overlooking the valley of Lauterbrunnen in the canton of Bern. Its summit is easily accessible from Mürren by a funicular, the Allmendhubelbahn, which reaches a height of 1,907 metres. A restaurant is also located near the top.

In winter, the Allmendhubel is part of a ski area and includes several ski lifts.

See also
List of mountains of Switzerland accessible by public transport

References

External links
 Allmendhubel on Hikr

Bernese Alps
Mountains of the Alps
Mountains of the canton of Bern
Mountains of Switzerland
One-thousanders of Switzerland